Linux Magazine is an international magazine for Linux software enthusiasts and professionals. It is published by the former Linux New Media division of the German media company Medialinx AG.

The magazine was first published in German in 1994, and later in English, Polish, Brazilian Portuguese, and Spanish. The German edition is called Linux-Magazin; the American/Canadian edition is Linux Pro Magazine. The founding company was Articon GmbH.

The magazine is published on the first Thursday of each month. Every issue includes a DVD-ROM, usually featuring a recent version of a Linux distribution.

Linux-Magazin
Linux-Magazin is among the oldest magazines about Linux in the world. The first German language issue appeared in October 1994, seven months after Linux Journals first issue, as the information paper for DELUG, the German Linux user group. The slogan of the magazine is „Die Zeitschrift für Linux-Professionals“ (German for "The magazine for Linux professionals").

InfoStrada's American-based magazine
When  launched their North American version of Linux-Magazin, to avoid a naming conflict with another magazine called Linux Magazine published in the United States by InfoStrada, Linux New Media's American and Canadian magazine took the name Linux Pro Magazine.Linux Magazine''' was a magazine about Linux written in English and published in the United States by Mountain View, California-based InfoStrada. Their magazine covered system administration, Linux distros, free software, Linux development and other topics.

In June 2008, Linux New Media USA, LLC purchased assets from InfoStrada related to their magazine. Consequently, InfoStrada's Linux Magazine was no longer offering print subscriptions. The website for InfoStrada's Linux Magazine was acquired by QuinStreet's Internet.com network, so no name-change was applied to Linux New Media's North American magazine. The latest article on QuinStreet's site is dated 30 June 2011.

In October 2016, Linux Voice merged as a special section into Linux Magazine.

 See also 
 Linux Format Linux Journal Linux Voice''

References

External links 
  
 Linux Pro Magazine 
 Linux-Magazin 
 Linux Magazine Brazil 
 Linux Magazine Poland 
 Linux Magazine Spain 

1994 establishments in Germany
Computer magazines published in Germany
German-language magazines
Linux magazines
Magazines established in 1994
Magazines published in Munich
Monthly magazines published in Germany